Zavolzhsk is a town and the administrative center of Zavolzhsky District in Ivanovo Oblast, Russia, located on the left bank of the Volga River, opposite Kineshma, and  northeast of Ivanovo, the administrative center of the oblast. It is one of the towns of the Golden Ring. Population:

History
It was established in 1934 as an urban-type settlement of Zavolzhye, conglomerated from several industrial settlements. It was granted town status and renamed on October 4, 1954.

Administrative and municipal status
Within the framework of administrative divisions, Zavolzhsk serves as the administrative center of Zavolzhsky District, to which it is directly subordinated. Prior to the adoption of the Law #145-OZ On the Administrative-Territorial Division of Ivanovo Oblast in December 2010, it used to be incorporated separately as an administrative unit with the status equal to that of the districts.

As a municipal division, the town of Zavolzhsk is incorporated within Zavolzhsky Municipal District as Zavolzhskoye Urban Settlement.

See also
Kineshma Bridge

References

Notes

Sources

Cities and towns in Ivanovo Oblast
Populated places on the Volga
Populated places established in 1934